Booth is an unincorporated community in Monongalia County, West Virginia, United States. Booth had a post office, which opened on December 24, 1926, and closed on November 9, 2002. An early variant name was River Seam.

References

Unincorporated communities in Monongalia County, West Virginia
Unincorporated communities in West Virginia
Coal towns in West Virginia